Anne Elisabeth Jane Claiborne (March 31, 1929 – June 26, 2007) was an American fashion designer and businesswoman. Her success was built upon stylish yet affordable apparel for career women featuring colorfully tailored separates that could be mixed and matched. Claiborne is best known for co-founding Liz Claiborne Inc., which in 1986 became the first company founded by a woman to make the Fortune 500 list. Claiborne was the first woman to become chair and CEO of a Fortune 500 company.

Early life and education
Claiborne was born in Brussels to American parents. She came from a prominent Louisiana family with an ancestor, William C. C. Claiborne, who served as Louisiana's first governor after statehood, during the War of 1812.

In 1939, at the start of World War II, the family returned to New Orleans. Claiborne attended St. Timothy's School for Girls, a small boarding school in Maryland. She and her sisters attended Mountain Lakes High School in Mountain Lakes, New Jersey.

Rather than finishing high school, Claiborne went to Europe to study art in the studios of painters. Her father did not believe that she needed an education, so she studied art informally.

Career
In 1949, Claiborne won the Jacques Heim National Design Contest (sponsored by Harper's Bazaar), and then moved to Manhattan where she worked for years in the Garment District on Seventh Avenue, as a sketch artist at Tina Leser, the sportswear producer. She also worked for the former Hollywood costume designer-turned-fashion designer, Omar Kiam. She worked as a designer for the Dan Keller and Youth Group Inc. fashion labels.

Liz Claiborne Inc.

Claiborne became frustrated by the failure of the companies that employed her to provide practical clothes for working women, so, with husband Art Ortenberg, Leonard Boxer, and Jerome Chazen, she launched her own design company, Liz Claiborne Inc., in 1976. It was an immediate success, with sales of $2 million in 1976 and $23 million in 1978. By 1988, it had acquired one-third of the American women's upscale sportswear market.

Marketing strategies that Claiborne developed changed the nature of retail stores. For example, Claiborne insisted that her line of clothing be displayed separately, as a department to itself and including all of the items she offered. This was the first time customers were able to select many types of clothing articles by brand name alone in one location of a department store. That tradition for the grouping of special brands has become the typical arrangement for name brands in contemporary stores.

In 1980, Liz Claiborne Accessories was founded through employee Nina McLemore (who decades later would launch a label of her own, in 2001). Liz Claiborne Inc. went public in 1981 and made the Fortune 500 list in 1986 with retail sales of $1.2 billion.

Claiborne listed all employees in her corporate directory in alphabetical order, to circumvent what she perceived as male hierarchies. She controlled meetings by ringing a glass bell and became famous for her love of red—"Liz Red". She sometimes would pose as a saleswoman to see what average women thought of her clothes.

Personal life, retirement, and death
Claiborne's first marriage was to Ben Shultz; it ended in divorce in 1954, after she met Arthur Ortenberg. In 1957, she and her now co-worker, Arthur (1926 - 2014) married. She had a son from her first marriage, Alexander G. Shultz, and two stepchildren from her second marriage, Neil Ortenberg and Nancy Ortenberg.

Claiborne retired from active management in 1989. By that stage, she had acquired other companies, notably Kayser-Roth, which produced Liz Claiborne accessories. Her husband retired at the same time, leaving the other founders as the active managers.

In retirement, Claiborne and Ortenberg established a foundation that distributed millions in funding to environmental causes, including funding the television series Nature on PBS and nature conservancy projects around the world. She received an Honorary Doctorate of Fine Arts from the Rhode Island School of Design.

Claiborne had been advised in May 1997 that she had a rare form of cancer affecting the lining of the abdomen. She died of the cancer on June 26, 2007, at the age of 78.

Awards and honors
1990 -  National Business Hall of Fame, sponsored by Junior Achievement
1991 - National Sales Hall of Fame
1991 - Honorary Doctorate from the Rhode Island School of Design
1993 - Golden Plate Award of the American Academy of Achievement
2000 - Council of Fashion Designers of America Lifetime Achievement Award

References

Further reading
 Chazen, Jerome A. "Notes from the apparel industry: Two decades at Liz Claiborne." Columbia Journal of World Business 31.2 (1996): 40–43.
 Dalby, Jill S., and M. Therese Flaherty. "Liz Claiborne, Inc. and Ruentex Industries, Ltd." Harvard Business School, Case 9 (1990): 690–748.
 Daria, Irene. The Fashion Cycle: A Behind the Scenes Look at a Year with Bill Blass, Liz Claiborne, Donna Karan, Arnold Scaasi, and Adrienne Vittadini (Simon and Schuster, 1990).
 Siggelkow, Nicolaj. "Change in the presence of fit: The rise, the fall, and the renaissance of Liz Claiborne." Academy of Management Journal 44.4 (2001): 838–857. Highly influential article online.

External links
Liz Claiborne Website
Liz Claiborne Art Ortenberg Foundation

1929 births
2007 deaths
American fashion designers
American women chief executives
American chief executives of fashion industry companies
Artists from New Orleans
Belgian emigrants to the United States
Businesspeople from Louisiana
Businesspeople from New York (state)
Deaths from cancer in New York (state)
Claiborne family
Deaths from stomach cancer
Mountain Lakes High School alumni
People from Fire Island, New York
20th-century American businesspeople
20th-century American businesswomen
American women fashion designers
Belgian people of American descent
21st-century American women